Bruceiella pruinosa is a species of sea snail, a marine gastropod mollusk in the family Skeneidae.

Description
The height of the shell attains 1.7 mm, its diameter 1.4 m.

Distribution
This marine species was found off North Island, New Zealand, at a depth of 900 m.

References

 Marshall, B.A. 1994: Deep-sea gastropods from the New Zealand region associated with Recent whale bones and an Eocene turtle. The Nautilus 108: 1-8 (p. 5)

External links
 To World Register of Marine Species

pruinosa
Gastropods described in 1994